The Nuna 4 is a solar car developed by the Delft University of Technology in 2006-2007 for the 2007 World Solar Challenge. 

It succeeded the Nuna 3, the solar car that scored a hat trick by winning the World Solar Challenge for the third time in a row. The Nuna4 also won the 2007 World Solar Challenge with an average speed of  ahead of the Belgian Umicore and Australian Aurora teams, making its fourth consecutive win. 

The Nuna4 measures 472 x 168 x 110 cm and weighs less than 190 kg (without driver). Its main innovation is its very light construction.

Technical specifications

Changes to previous version
Because of risks involved with the high speeds reached by the solar cars in the previous races (Nuna3 averaged over ) and tighter speed limits on the Australian roads the rules were changed for the 2007 race to enhance safety and reduce speed.

These changes are
 Nuna4 solar panel is smaller, measuring 6m2 instead of 9m2. This means that it is slower and much smaller than its predecessor.
 The driver sits almost upright. In previous Nuna cars the driver was lying down.
 The driver is protected not only by a tough canopy, but also by roll bars and a helmet.
 Nuna4 has a steering wheel. Previous versions were steered by levers.
 Nuna4 is higher. That makes it frontal surface area rather bigger, but the consequences of that are partially offset by even better aerodynamics.

Adaptive cruise control
Nuna4 is equipped with a GPS-tracking system. Its data is transferred via a WiFi connection to a support vehicle. A computer in the support vehicle calculates the optimum speed based on the data from the car and additional information including wind speed and direction, the gradient of the road, solar conditions and the state of the batteries. This speed is sent wireless to the Nuna4 cruise control. The car accelerates or decelerates accordingly. The driver only has to steer whilst driving using this adaptive cruise control system.

See also
 Nuna main article about the Nuna series of Dutch solar cars
 Twente One a challenging Dutch solar car, which succeeded the SolUTra.
 List of solar car teams
 World Solar Challenge

References

External links
  web site of the Nuna4 team

Solar car racing
Delft University of Technology
Science and technology in the Netherlands
Dutch inventions